Mukteshwar Legislative Assembly constituency was one of the seventy electoral Uttarakhand Legislative Assembly constituencies of Uttarakhand state in India. It was abolished in 2012 following the delimitation.

Mukteshwar Legislative Assembly constituency was a part of Nainital–Udhamsingh Nagar (Lok Sabha constituency).

Members of Legislative Assembly

See also
 Bhimtal (Uttarakhand Assembly constituency)

References

Former assembly constituencies of Uttarakhand
2002 establishments in Uttarakhand
Constituencies established in 2002